Urswick Grammar School was located in Little Urswick, Cumbria, England. The school was founded in 1585 as the result of a royal charter granted by Queen Elizabeth I.

For the first few years, boys were educated by the minister in the church. Subsequently, the school building was built in Little Urswick.

Amalgamation
This building, with various extensions, remained in use until the late 1990s, when the school was amalgamated with two other local primary schools to form Low Furness Primary School, which is located in Great Urswick. The disused school buildings have been converted into housing.

Visit of Queen Elizabeth II 
In 1985, the school celebrated its quatercentenary. In celebration of this fact the Queen visited the school. This was part of a year-long programme of Elizabethan-themed events.

Resources
Low Furness in the 17th and 18th centuries

 

Furness
Defunct schools in Cumbria
1584 establishments in England
Educational institutions established in the 1580s
Defunct grammar schools in England
Schools with a royal charter